This is a list of serious heat waves in India.

Difficulties in estimation 

Recent computerization of healthcare and adoption of diagnostic codes like ICD-10 makes tracking of causality during estimation harder, resulting in underestimations, despite more complete data being available upon diagnosis.

See also 
 List of heat waves
 Climate of India
 Climate change in South Asia  
 Climate change
 Heat stroke - ICD-10 code: T67

Notes

References 

Heat waves in India
Heat
Heat waves